The Archdiocese of Anchorage–Juneau is an ecclesiastical territory of the Roman Catholic Church that covers the southern part of the state of Alaska in the United States.  

The archdiocese is led by an archbishop who serves as pastor of both Our Lady of Guadalupe Cathedral in Anchorage and the Cathedral of the Nativity of the Blessed Virgin Mary in Juneau. The archdiocese is a metropolitan see, with a single suffragan diocese, the Diocese of Fairbanks.

The archdiocese was erected in 2020 when Pope Francis merged the former Archdiocese of Anchorage with the former Diocese of Juneau.

History

Early history
John Althoff, a young Dutch priest of the Canadian  Diocese of Vancouver Island, established the first permanent Catholic presence in Alaska, then a U.S. territory.   His superior, Bishop Charles J. Seghers, sent Althoff to Wrangell, Alaska, to serve that town,  the Cassiar mining district on the Stikine River, and the former Russian capital of Sitka. 

Althoff founded Saint Rose of Lima Parish in Wrangell, Alaska, on May 3, 1879.  On visits to Sitka, he would celebrate Mass in an old Russian carriage barn.  After the discovery of gold near Juneau, Althoff moved his mission there.  He celebrated the first mass and baptism in an interdenominational "Log Cabin Church" on July 17, 1882.

The Alaska missions continued to expand as more missionaries arrived in the region.  On July 27, 1894, Pope Leo XIII erected the Prefecture Apostolic of Alaska in Juneau, encompassing the entire territory of Alaska from the Diocese of Vancouver Island and the Diocese of New Westminster.

On December 22, 1916, Pope Benedict XV elevated the prefecture apostolic to a vicariate apostolic.  He appointed Joseph Crimont, the prefect apostolic of Alaska, as its vicar apostolic on February 15,1917.  The vicariate received its first bishop when Crimont was consecrated on July 25, 1917.

Initial formation
Pope Pius XII erected the Diocese of Juneau on June 23, 1951.  The new diocese was carved out of the former Vicariate Apostolic of Alaska.  Pius XII designated the Church of the Nativity of the Blessed Virgin Mary in Juneau as the cathedral for the new diocese.  On October 3, 1951, Dermot O'Flanagan was consecrated as the first bishop of Juneau.

Separation
During the second half of the 20th century, Alaska's population and business growth centered around Anchorage, even though Juneau remained the state's capital.  In recognition of these changes, on January 22, 1966, Pope Paul VI erected the Archdiocese of Anchorage.  The new archdiocese took the territory "lying west of Mount Saint Elias and Icy Bay" from the Diocese of Juneau. The pope designated the Church of the Holy Family in Anchorage as its cathedral church.  

The erection of the Archdiocese of Anchorage reduced the Diocese of Juneau to about twenty parishes and missions, plus the Shrine of St. Thérèse of Lisieux in the Tongass National Forest.  The Diocese of Fairbanks and the Diocese of Juneau were now the suffragan sees of the new archdiocese.

Events during the period of separation

The Archdiocese of Anchorage hosted several visits from Pope John Paul II. In 1981, he celebrated mass on the Anchorage Park Strip before 50,000 people.

As the archdiocese continued to grow, the Cathedral of the Holy Family became too small to host major diocesan services.  Archbishop Roger Schwietz petitioned the Holy See in 2013 to designate Our Lady of Guadalupe Church a co-cathedral, keeping Holy Family as the historic cathedral.  The Vatican granted its approval in October 2014 and Schwietz elevated the Church of Our Lady of Guadalupe to a co-cathedral on its titular feast, December 12, 2014.

On October 1, 2016, Bishop Edward J. Burns of Juneau announced that the United States Conference of Catholic Bishops (USCCB) and its Committee on Divine Worship had designated the Shrine of Saint Thérèse of Lisieux as a national shrine.

Reunification

On May 19, 2020, Pope Francis announced the merger of the Archdiocese of Anchorage and the Diocese of Juneau into the Archdiocese of Anchorage–Juneau, canonically effected by erecting a new metropolitan archdiocese and suppressing both the Diocese of Juneau and the Archdiocese of Anchorage. The Diocese of Fairbanks became the suffragan diocese.  The merger took effect at the mass of installation of Andrew E. Bellisario, then bishop of Juneau and apostolic administrator of the Archdiocese of Anchorage, as the first archbishop of the new archdiocese on September 17, 2020.  The decree of erection incardinated, or transferred, all the clergy of the former Diocese of Juneau and the former Archdiocese of Anchorage into the new archdiocese.  This decree also designated the Cathedral of Our Lady of Guadalupe in Anchorage as the primary cathedral and the Cathedral of the Nativity of the Virgin Mary as the co-cathedral.

The Church of the Holy Family in Anchorage lost its role as a cathedral when the merger took effect, but it continues to serve as a parish church.

Coat of arms

The coat of arms of the new archdiocese "... includes elements from the arms of the previous dioceses. The horizontal line in the middle represents the horizon separating the earth from the heavens, and the wavy lines at the bottom, taken from the Juneau crest, represent the water under the dome of the sky. All of these represent the beauty of creation in the archdiocese, first inhabited by the Native peoples of Alaska. The elements above the horizon line are also taken from the Juneau crest. The constellation of the Great Bear with the North Star recalls the Alaska flag and represents the State of Alaska. The North Star, which has guided and inspired Alaskans from the earliest days, also represents the Blessed Virgin Mary, “Star of the Sea.” The crescent moon represents the Nativity of the Blessed Virgin Mary and the first and oldest Catholic Cathedral in Alaska, located in the Capital City of Juneau. The triple-pronged anchor, taken from the crest of the Archdiocese of Anchorage, represents the virtue of hope, the Holy Trinity, and the Municipality of Anchorage, the largest in Alaska."  The images to the left in the history section, above, show the respective coats of arms from which these symbols came.

Bishops

Bishops of Juneau 
 Robert Dermot O'Flanagan (1951-1968)
 Francis Thomas Hurley (1971-1976), appointed archbishop of Anchorage
 Michael Hughes Kenny (1979-1995)
 Michael William Warfel (1996-2007), appointed bishop of Great Falls-Billings
 Edward James Burns (2009-2017), appointed bishop of Dallas
 Andrew Eugene Bellisario (2017–2020), appointed archbishop of Anchorage–Juneau

Archbishops of Anchorage 
 John Joseph Thomas Ryan (1966–1975), appointed coadjutor archbishop for the Military Services and subsequently succeeded to that see
 Francis Thomas Hurley (1976–2001)
 Roger Lawrence Schwietz (2001–2016)
 Paul Dennis Etienne (2016–2019), appointed coadjutor archbishop of Seattle and subsequently succeeded to that see

Archbishops of Anchorage–Juneau 
 Andrew E. Bellisario (2020–present)

Priests of the Archdiocese of Anchorage who became bishops of other dioceses
Michael William Warfel, appointed Bishop of Juneau in 1996

High schools
 Lumen Christi Junior/Senior High School, Anchorage

Publications
Each former jurisdiction published a monthly newspaper prior to the merger.

 The Archdiocese published a monthly newspaper, Catholic Anchor, with approximately 11,000 subscribers. It was established in April 1999.
 The Diocese of Juneau published its newspaper, The Inside Passage, on its web site.

A FAQ published on the web site of both former dioceses soon after the announcement of the merger stated that the new archdiocese will discontinue both newspapers and inaugurate a new publication to replace them.  The new Archdiocese of Anchorage-Juneau subsequently introduced a monthly publication called The North Star Catholic.

Suffragan see
The ecclesiastical province of Anchorage–Juneau encompasses the state of Alaska.  The sole suffragan diocese is the Diocese of Fairbanks.Before the merger, the Diocese of Juneau and the Diocese of Fairbanks were suffragan dioceses of the Archdiocese of Anchorage.

See also
 Ecclesiastical Province of Anchorage
 List of Roman Catholic archdioceses (by country and continent)
 List of Roman Catholic dioceses (alphabetical) (including archdioceses)
 List of Roman Catholic dioceses (structured view) (including archdioceses)
 List of the Catholic dioceses of the United States

References

External links
Roman Catholic Archdiocese of Anchorage–Juneau Official Site
Catholic Social Services Alaska

 
Roman Catholic dioceses in the United States
 
Christian organizations established in 1966
Roman Catholic dioceses and prelatures established in the 20th century
1966 establishments in Alaska